Rugby league is a full contact football code and spectator sport played in various countries around the world and governed by the Rugby League International Federation. As of 2010 there are currently 27 nations fielding domestic leagues that meet the World Cup eligibility requirements. Further to this there are over 30 others that are playing at an emerging level status at varying degrees of international competition and are in the process of developing the game in their nations. The global player pool is estimated to be in the millions.

Although one of the last football codes to be developed, since the 1990s professional era the game has expanded outside of its traditionals heartlands in Australia, England, France and New Zealand. As a result, many players of European, and Pacific Islander background have risen to the top professional level in the two major domestic leagues, the National Rugby League and Super League.

Whilst individual international test matches between nations have been staged regularly since the sport's inception in 1908, the first multi-national tournament was held in France in 1954, making it the first World Cup of either rugby code and the first to be officially known as the "Rugby World Cup".

Africa

Rugby league is a growing sport in Africa, with the game first introduced to the continent in early 2017. The vast distance of teams from the game's heartlands has at times affected the development of the sport but new advances in the 21st century have seen a major increase in the number of internationals scheduled. Many high calibre players from the continent have progressed to the top club leagues, including Younes Khattabi, Jamal Fakir, Tom van Vollenhoven, Fred Griffiths and Jarrod Saffy. The large ex-patriate Moroccan population in the south of France has resulted in a growing interchange of players between the two countries. Rugby league in Africa is played in South Africa, Gambia, Morocco, Burundi, Nigeria and Ghana.

Countries that meet current World Cup qualification criteria:

Other countries with a history of the game:

Americas

Rugby league is a growing sport in the Americas, having first started with All Star exhibition matches in the 1950s. It has been played at an organised semi-professional level in North America since it was first introduced as a competition sport in the 1990s. There are currently domestic leagues operating in Jamaica, Canada and the United States. Many players of Caribbean heritage live and play in the Super League and have brought their skills back to the islands to foster the development of thousands of new players. The game is also played at a lower amateur level across the Americas by ex-patriates although only recognised national organisations are listed here for brevity.

Canada currently has two domestic competitions, Ontario and British Columbia, with British Columbia being the premier competition with also the most teams.  British Columbia Rugby League (BCRL) also has a provincial team known as the BC Bulldogs.  In 2012, the BC Bulldogs competed against Utah Avalanche from Salt Lake who currently play in the AMNRL.  The game was contested over two legs, home and away, with BC taking both games.  The BC Bulldogs also made an appearance at the Las Vegas Remembrance Cup and come third. Coogee Bay Dolphins from Australia took out the competition for the second time in a row.

In 2013, BCRL will be made up of 6 teams, namely Bayside Sharks, Kelowna Crows, Richmond Bears, Sea to Sky Eagles, Surrey Beavers and Vancouver Dragons.

Brazil has also taken up the sport in 2013.

Since 2013 the Latin Heat Rugby League has had moderate success in introducing rugby League to players with Latin American heritage living in Australia. In 2014 the Latin Heat opened a U.S chapter.

Countries that meet current World Cup qualification criteria:

Other countries with a history of the game:

Asia
Rugby league is a growing sport in Asia and the Middle East, with a large growth in players since the 1990s, some of which have played at the game's elite levels in the National Rugby League and Super League. The game in the Middle East is one of the fastest growing sports with regular internationals played against European and Mediterranean teams. Although Russia has a growing rugby league presence and extends into Asia, the main competition is in Europe.

Countries that meet current World Cup qualification criteria:

Other countries with a history of the game:

Europe

World Cup eligibile: Serbia, Norway, Russia, Ireland, Scotland, Wales, Italy, Czech Republic, England, France, Germany, Netherlands, Ukraine and Greece

England is the birthplace of rugby league. Rugby league is a moderately popular game in parts of Europe.
 England is home to the professional Super League, with a team from France and Canada participating at different times during its history.
 Great Britain is an RLIF test nation, with players from England, Scotland and Wales.
 Russia is an RLIF test nation, and the sport is popular there.
 Norway, Czech Republic, Spain, Germany, Greece, Malta, Turkey,  are all affiliate RLIF nations. In 2020. full members of RLIF from Europe are: England, France, Scotland, Wales, Ireland, Russia, Serbia, Italy, Ukraine.
 The game also has a history in Georgia.

Oceania

Rugby league is a popular sport in Oceania and the Pacific islands. Australia, New Zealand and Papua New Guinea are the main nations playing rugby league in Oceania.  
The Cook Islands, Tonga, Samoa and Fiji are also RLIF test nations.
Affiliate nations include Vanuatu, American Samoa, New Caledonia, Niue and Tokelau.
The Solomon Islands also have some history of the sport.

Countries that meet current World Cup qualification criteria:

Non-IRL associated

See also

List of international rugby league teams
List of rugby league competitions

Notes

References

Rugby league
Rugby league